The Rankin County School District is the 3rd largest public school district in Mississippi. The district office is located in Brandon, Mississippi (USA).

In addition to Brandon, the district serves most of Rankin County, including the communities of Florence, Flowood, Pelahatchie, Puckett, Richland, and Sandhill.

History

The Rankin County School District is one of the top three sizeable public school districts in Mississippi. There are 28 schools, over 18,000 students in the district, and the district serves over seven different cities. RCSD is known for their recreational and outdoor activities. In 2013, RCSD was the defendant in a federal lawsuit regarding religion in public schools after Northwest Rankin High School subjected students to mandatory Christian assemblies. The case settled, but in 2014 the RCSD violated the settlement by inviting a Methodist preacher to lead a prayer during a District wide awards ceremony. Judge Carlton Reeves of Mississippi's Southern District ruled in favor of the Plaintiff in 2015. In 2014 board president Cecil McCrory, a former member of the Mississippi Legislature, resigned from his position prior to a federal indictment for corruption activities, involving private prison contracts with the Mississippi Department of Corrections. McCrory and Epps pleaded guilty to federal charges in February of the following year.

Schools

Brandon Zone
Brandon High School (Grades 9-12)
Brandon Middle School (Grades 6-8)
Brandon Elementary School (Grades 4-5)
Stonebridge Elementary School (Grades 2-3)
Rouse Elementary School (Grades K-1)
Learning Center 
Florence Zone
Florence High School (Grades 9-12)
Florence Middle School (Grades 6-8)
Florence Elementary School (Grades 3-5)
Steen's Creek Elementary School (Grades K-2)
McLaurin Zone
McLaurin High School (Grades 7-12)
McLaurin Elementary School (Grades PK-6)
Northwest Zone
Northwest Rankin High School (Grades 9-12)
Northwest Rankin Middle School (Grades 6-8)
Northwest Rankin Elementary School (Grades K-5)
Flowood Elementary School (Grades K-5)
Northshore Elementary School (Grades K-5)
Oakdale Elementary School (Grades K-5)
Highland Bluff Elementary School (Grades K-5)
Pelahatchie Zone
Pelahatchie High School (Grades 7-12)
Pelahatichie Elementary School (Grades K-6)
Pisgah Zone
Pisgah High School (Grades 7-12)
Pisgah Elementary School (Grades K-6)
Puckett Zone
Puckett Attendance Center (Grades K-12)
Richland Zone
Richland High School (Grades 7-12)
Richland Upper Elementary School (Grades 3-6)
Richland Elementary School (Grades K-2)
Alternative School
Rankin County Learning Center

Demographics
In 2017 22% of the students were black. That year, under Mississippi school accountability rankings, the district received an "A".

2006-07 school year
There were a total of 17,398 students enrolled in the Rankin County School District during the 2006–2007 school year. The gender makeup of the district was 49% female and 51% male. The racial makeup of the district was 21.54% African American, 75.91% White, 1.32% Hispanic, 1.14% Asian, and 0.09% Native American. 27.7% of the district's students were eligible to receive free lunch.

Previous school years

Accountability statistics

See also
List of school districts in Mississippi

References

External links
Rankin County School District

Education in Rankin County, Mississippi
School districts in Mississippi
1940 establishments in Mississippi
Brandon, Mississippi